
Year 267 (CCLXVII) was a common year starting on Tuesday (link will display the full calendar) of the Julian calendar. At the time, it was known as the Year of the Consulship of Paternus and Arcesilaus (or, less frequently, year 1020 Ab urbe condita). The denomination 267 for this year has been used since the early medieval period, when the Anno Domini calendar era became the prevalent method in Europe for naming years.

Events 
 By place 

 Roman Empire 
 First Gothic invasion: The Goths, originally from Scandinavia, with the Sarmatians (from modern Iran), invade the Balkans and Greece. They ravage  Moesia and Thrace.
 The Heruli invade the Black Sea coast; they unsuccessfully attack Byzantium and Cyzicus. The Roman fleet defeats the Herulian fleet (500 ships) but allows them to escape into the Aegean Sea, where they raid the islands of Lemnos and Skyros.
 The Goths sack several cities of southern Greece including Athens, Corinth, Argos and Sparta. After the Sack of Athens, an Athenian militia force (2,000 men), under the historian Dexippus, pushes the invaders to the north where they are intercepted by the Roman army under emperor Gallienus. He wins an important victory near the Nestos River, on the boundary between Macedonia and Thrace.
 Aureolus, charged with defending Italy, defeats Victorinus (co-emperor of Gaul), is proclaimed emperor by his troops, and begins his march on Rome.

 Near East 

 King Septimius Odaenathus of Palmyra makes plans for a campaign in Cappadocia against the Goths. He is assassinated, along with his eldest son, most probably by his nephew due to a previous altercation between him and Odaenathus. His wife Zenobia succeeds him, and rules Vaballathus (the Palmyrene Empire) with her young son.

Births 
 Pei Wei (or Yimin), Chinese philosopher and politician (d. 300)

Deaths 
 Septimius Herodianus, co-king of Palmyra (assassinated)
 Septimius Odaenathus, king of Palmyra (assassinated)

References